The Diwan ḏ-Qadaha Rba Šuma ḏ-Mara ḏ-Rabuta u-Dmut Kušṭa ("The Scroll of the Great Prayer, the Name of the Lord of Greatness and the Image of Truth"), or simply the Dmut Kušṭa (or Dmuth Kushta), is a Mandaean religious text. It is written as an illustrated scroll. No published translation of the text currently exists.

Manuscripts
The Bodleian Library at Oxford University holds a manuscript of the text, catalogued as Ms. Asiat. Misc. C 12. The scroll was copied by Yahia Ram Zihrun, son of Mhatam in 1818 in Qurna. It was acquired by E. S. Drower in 1954.

In 1969, Kurt Rudolph had also seen a copy of the text at a private library in Dora, Baghdad.

A digitized Mandaic version of the Dmut Kušṭa in typesetted Mandaic script has been published online by Majid Fandi al-Mubaraki, a Mandaean living in Australia.

References

Bibliography
Nasoraia, Brikha (2022). A Critical Edition, with Translation and Analytical Study of Diwan Qadaha Rba D-Dmuth Kusta (The Scroll of Great Creation of the Image/Likeness of Truth) (forthcoming). Belgium: Brepols Publishers.
Nasoraia, Brikha (2022). The Esoteric and Mystical Concepts of the Mandaean Nasoraean Illustrated Scroll: Diwan Qadaha Rba D-dmuth Kusta (the Scroll of the Great Creation of the Image/likeness of Truth) (forthcoming). Belgium: Brepols Publishers.
 
Nasoraia, Brikha (2010). The Esoteric and Mystical Concepts of the Mandaean Nasoraean Illustrated Scroll: Diwan Qadaha Rba D-dmuth Kusta (the Scroll of the Great Creation of the Image/likeness of Truth). Sydney, Australia: University of Sydney.

External links
Diwan Dmuth Kushta (Mandaic text from the Mandaean Network)
Diwan Dmuth Kushta (Mandaic text from the Mandaean Network)

Mandaean texts